Abdullah Nuri may refer to:
Abdollah Nouri, Iranian politician
Abdullo Nuri, Tajik politician